Karsten Nied (born 8 August 1969) is a former German footballer who was part of the Hertha BSC reserve team that reached the 1992–93 DFB-Pokal final.

References 

1969 births
Living people
German footballers
Association football defenders
Hertha BSC II players
Tennis Borussia Berlin players
FC Gütersloh 2000 players
Footballers from Berlin
West German footballers